Bear Glacier Provincial Park is a provincial park in British Columbia, Canada.

The toe of Bear Glacier is visible from British Columbia Highway 37A roughly halfway between the Meziadin Junction and Stewart.

The glacier was part of the closing scene in the film "Insomnia" with Al Pacino.

References

External links 

BC Parks website

Boundary Ranges
Provincial parks of British Columbia
Nisga'a
2000 establishments in British Columbia